Pimelea spectabilis, or Bunjong, is a species of shrub in the family Thymelaeaceae, endemic to Western Australia. It is erect in habit, growing to between 0.5 and 2 metres high. The pink and white flowers are produced between August and December in its native range.

The species was first formally described by English botanist John Lindley in 1839 in A sketch of the vegetation of the Swan River colony.

References

spectabilis
Rosids of Western Australia
Malvales of Australia